Amarendra Nath Sen (born 1 October 1920) was a Bengali Indian jurist, who served as the chief justice of the Calcutta High Court in 1979 and as a judge in the Supreme Court of India. His grandfather Baikuntha Nath Sen was a notable political leader and prominent lawyer of Bengal.

Early life and education
Born on 1 October 1920, he studied at the Saidabad Hardinge H.E. School in Murshidabad, the Krishnath College in Berhampore, the Scottish Church College and the Hazra Law College of the University of Calcutta. Subsequently, he passed his Barrister-at-Law examinations from the Inner Temple in London.

Career
He had started out as an advocate at the Calcutta High Court prior to independence in January 1947. He dealt with mainly civil cases in the Calcutta High Court.  He was appointed an additional judge, and later a permanent judge there in 1966. He was appointed the chief justice of the Calcutta High Court in December 1979. He was appointed a judge in the Supreme Court of India in January 1981. He retired in September 1985.

References

1920 births
Indian barristers
Judges of the Calcutta High Court
Justices of the Supreme Court of India
Members of the Inner Temple
Scottish Church College alumni
University of Calcutta alumni
Possibly living people
Chief Justices of the Calcutta High Court
20th-century Indian judges
20th-century Indian lawyers
Krishnath College alumni